L'Isle-d'Abeau is a commune in the department of Isère in southeastern France. It lies 35 kilometres southeast from Lyon. It is part of the urban unit (agglomeration) of Bourgoin-Jallieu, and of the functional area of Lyon.

Urban development
This little city was developed with the creation of the new town. It has 8 primary schools (1 is private), three middle schools, one high school and 2 IUT dedicated to informatic and multimedia jobs.

The municipality gave its name to a new town, whose creation was decided in 1970 to canalize the demographic growth of the Lyon agglomeration. It is organized in a New Agglomeration Union, together with Four, Saint-Quentin-Fallavier, Vaulx-Milieu and Villefontaine. Since January 1, 2007, the Union became the Communauté d'agglomération Porte de l'Isère, with over 106,000 inhabitants in 22 municipalities.

Population

International relations
L'Isle-d'Abeau is twinned with:
  San Vicente del Raspeig (Alicante, Spain).

See also
Communes of the Isère department

References

External links
Official site

Communes of Isère
New towns in France
New towns started in the 1960s